In probability theory, moment closure is an approximation method used to estimate moments of a stochastic process.

Introduction
Typically, differential equations describing the i-th moment will depend on the (i + 1)-st moment. To use moment closure, a level is chosen past which all cumulants are set to zero. This leaves a resulting closed system of equations which can be solved for the moments. The approximation is particularly useful in models with a very large state space, such as stochastic population models.

History

The moment closure approximation was first used by Goodman and Whittle who set all third and higher-order cumulants to be zero, approximating the population distribution with a normal distribution.

In 2006, Singh and Hespanha proposed a closure which approximates the population distribution as a log-normal distribution to describe biochemical reactions.

Applications

The approximation has been used successfully to model the spread of the Africanized bee in the Americas, nematode infection in ruminants. and quantum tunneling  in ionization experiments.

References

Stochastic processes